Thomas Lars Olof Olsson (born 15 February 1976) is a Swedish former professional footballer who played as a midfielder. His last professional club was IFK Göteborg. After playing for the local club Åtvidabergs FF, he joined IFK Norrköping in 1998. In 2003, he joined Malmö FF with which he has won one Swedish championship. He moved on to IFK Göteborg before the 2006 season, and was a key player there during their gold season 2007. Olsson retired from professional football after the 2011 season.

Honours

Malmö FF
Allsvenskan: 2004
IFK Göteborg
Allsvenskan: 2007

Svenska Cupen: 2008

References

External links

Elite Prospects profile

Swedish footballers
Allsvenskan players
Åtvidabergs FF players
Malmö FF players
IFK Göteborg players
IFK Norrköping players
1976 births
Living people
IFK Göteborg non-playing staff
Association football midfielders